In the boys' singles tournament of the 2009 Australian Open, Yuki Bhambri won in the final 6–3, 6–1, against Alexandros Georgoudas.

Bernard Tomic was the defending champion, but chose to compete in the men's singles this year.

Seeds

Draw

Finals

Top half

Section 1

Section 2

Bottom half

Section 3

Section 4

External links
Main Draw
Qualifying Draw

Boys' Singles
Australian Open, 2009 Boys' Singles